Matthew J. Smith (born June 15, 1979) is an American former professional baseball player. He was a left-handed relief pitcher who graduated from Bishop Gorman High School, where he played baseball.  He was a 3-year letter winner and is the all-time leader in strikeouts (348) at OSU and was named to the Big 12 Second Team twice and First Team once. One of his favorite hobbies is golf.

He was drafted in the 44th round (1310th overall) in the 1997 Major League Baseball draft by the Chicago White Sox, but did not sign and attended Oklahoma State University.  He was drafted again in the 4th round in the 2000 Major League Baseball draft by the New York Yankees.

He split the 2005 season with the Yankees' Double-A affiliate, the Trenton Thunder, and the Triple-A affiliate, the Columbus Clippers. In 47 games, he pitched 82 innings, posting a 2.65 ERA and a (5-4) record.  Smith made his major-league debut on April 14, 2006, against the Minnesota Twins and recorded one out before being removed from the game.

Smith, C.J. Henry, and two other minor league players were traded in July 2006 by the Yankees to the Phillies in exchange for Bobby Abreu and Cory Lidle. Smith pitched in 14 games for the Phillies in 2006.

In 2007, Smith pitched in nine games for the Phillies, compiling an 11.25 ERA before being optioned to the Triple-A Ottawa Lynx in late April. Smith went 2–1 with a 2.60 ERA and one save before being placed on the disabled list retroactively to June 13. Smith underwent Tommy John surgery on July 4, 2007. Smith was designated for assignment on January 4, 2008, and released, but was later re-signed to a minor league contract and invited to spring training on January 15. He became a free agent at the end of the 2008 season and signed a minor league contract with the Chicago Cubs in January .  Smith was released by the Cubs after the 2009 spring training season.

External links

1979 births
Living people
American expatriate baseball players in Canada
Arizona Diamondbacks scouts
Bishop Gorman High School alumni
Baseball players from Nevada
Clearwater Threshers players
Columbus Clippers players
Greensboro Bats players
Florida Complex League Phillies players
Los Angeles Dodgers scouts
Major League Baseball pitchers
New York Yankees players
Norwich Navigators players
Oklahoma State Cowboys baseball players
Ottawa Lynx players
Philadelphia Phillies players
Staten Island Yankees players
Tampa Yankees players
Trenton Thunder players
San Diego Padres scouts
Scranton/Wilkes-Barre Red Barons players